Batnorov is a sum (district) of Khentii Province in eastern Mongolia. Berkh town is 35 km SW from Batnorov sum center. In 2010, its population was 2,693.

References 

Districts of Khentii Province